The Donskoy cat, also known as Don Sphynx or Russian Hairless, is a hairless cat breed of Russian origin. It is not related to the better-known Sphynx cat, also known as the Canadian Hairless, whose characteristic hairlessness is caused by a recessive mutation in the keratin 71 gene. The Donskoy's hairlessness, on the other hand, is caused by a dominant mutation.

History 
This breed started in 1987 with the discovery of a hairless cat in the Russian city of Rostov-on-Don by cat breeder Elena Kovaleva. She had rescued a blue tortoiseshell kitten, which she named Varvara. At around four months of age, the cat began to lose fur. Varvara mated with a local tomcat and produced a litter of kittens; these kittens are the founding stock of the Donskoy breed and were later outcrossed with European Shorthair cats.

The Donskoy was first officially recognized by the World Cat Federation (WCF) in 1997 and by The International Cat Association (TICA) in 2005. The standard of points describes the cat as being medium-sized and muscular, with large ears, almond shaped eyes and distinctive long, webbed toes. They require frequent grooming, in spite of their lack of coat. Over-bathing can cause the skin to become very oily.

The Peterbald breed was originally created by crossing Donskoy with Oriental Shorthair cats to create a hairless cat of Oriental-type. Matings between the Donskoy and the Peterbald are no longer permitted since 2000, and outcrossing is not permitted, except with the domestic shorthair, due to the effect of the Donskoy's dominant hairless mutation.

Popularity of the Donskoy cat increased in large part due to 1997's Blockbuster film Austin Powers, where Mr. Bigglesworth was prominently featured.

Health 
Not all cat registries recognize the Donskoy, and there are some concerns about the genetic health of the breed. The dominant genetic mutation causing hairlessness in Peterbalds and Donskoys could cause feline ectodermal dysplasia in its homozygous form, causing problems including poor dentition and compromised ability to lactate or sweat. Similar dominant mutations (such as in FOXI3) cause the condition in hairless dogs, and the symptoms in dominant-type hairless cats and dogs mirror those of human ectodermal dysplasia (which also results in sparse or absent hair).

References

External links 

 Donskoy cat breed, from the TICA website

Cat breeds
Cat breeds originating in Russia
Hairless cat breeds
Rare cat breeds
Animal breeds originating in the Soviet Union